Neapolitan pizza, also known as Naples-style pizza, is a style of pizza made with tomatoes and mozzarella cheese. The tomatoes must be either San Marzano tomatoes or Pomodorino del Piennolo del Vesuvio, which grow on the volcanic plains to the south of Mount Vesuvius. The cheese must be Mozzarella di Bufala Campana, a protected designation of origin cheese made with the milk from water buffalo raised in the marshlands of Campania and Lazio in a semi-wild state, or Fior di Latte, a cow's milk mozzarella created according to the procedure for which it was registered as a Traditional Speciality Guaranteed (TSG). Pizza Napoletana is a Traditional Speciality Guaranteed (TSG) product in the European Union and the United Kingdom, and the art of its making is included on UNESCO's list of intangible cultural heritage.

Recipe 

According to the rules proposed by the Associazione Verace Pizza Napoletana, the genuine Neapolitan pizza dough consists of wheat flour, natural Neapolitan yeast or brewer's yeast, salt and water. The dough is always fat-free and sugar-free.  The regulations specify that the dough must be made primarily from a medium-strength (W value of 250–320; 11–13.5% protein), finely ground wheat flour, with no more than 20% of the flour being strong flour (W value above 350). Since the end of World War II in Italy, when strong flour was imported from Canada as part of the Marshall Plan, this strong flour has been called Manitoba flour.

The dough must be kneaded by hand or with a low-speed mixer. The pizza must be baked for 60–90 seconds in a  wood-fired oven. When cooked, it should be soft, elastic, tender and fragrant.

Variants
There are different variants, but the original one is called Pizza Margherita, and it follows the essential rules for the ingredients, tomato, sliced mozzarella, basil and extra virgin olive oil, sometimes with a sprinkle of parmesan cheese on top. Other variants are: Pizza marinara, which is made with tomato, garlic, oregano and extra virgin olive oil and Pizza Margherita DOP made with tomato, buffalo mozzarella from Campania, basil and extra virgin olive oil. The pizza napoletana is a Traditional Speciality Guaranteed (TSG) product in Europe. The TSG certification attests that a particular food product objectively possesses specific characteristics which differentiate it from all others in its category, and that its raw materials, composition or method of production have been consistent for a minimum of 30 years.

UNI and Traditional Speciality Guaranteed 
Neapolitan pizza has a protected status granted by the Italian Standardization Body administered by the Associazione Vera Pizza Napoletana (AVPN). A protected designation is available to pizzerias that meet strict requirements in following Neapolitan traditions in the art of pizza making.

The European Union has recognized Pizza Napoletana as Traditional Speciality Guaranteed since 5 February 2010.

See also
 List of pizza varieties by country
 New Haven-style pizza (US), closely related to Neopolitan

References

External links
 Associazione Vera Pizza Napoletana (AVPN)

Pizza varieties
Neapolitan cuisine
Traditional Speciality Guaranteed products from Italy
Pizza styles